Outinen is a Finnish surname. Notable people with the surname include:

 Kati Outinen (born 1961), Finnish actress
 Mikko Outinen (born 1971), Finnish ice hockey player
 Kristian Outinen (born 1983), Danish swimmer

Finnish-language surnames